Lakatan bananas, also spelled Lacatan, are diploid banana cultivars from the Philippines. It is one of the most common banana cultivars in the Philippines, along with the Latundan and Saba bananas. 

Lakatan bananas should not be confused with the Cavendish banana Masak Hijau, which is also known as "Lacatan" in Latin America and the West Indies.

Taxonomy and Nomenclature
The Lakatan banana is a diploid (AA) cultivar. According to Promusa, it is a triploid (AAA) 

Its official designation is Musa acuminata (AA Group) 'Lakatan'.

Synonyms include:
 Musa x paradisiaca L.  ssp. sapientum (L.) Kuntze var. lacatan Blanco 
 Musa acuminata Colla (Cavendish Group) cv. 'Lacatan'

The Cavendish cultivar Masak Hijau is also called "Lacatan" in Latin America and the West Indies. The latter is known as "Bungulan" in the Philippines. To avoid confusion, the Philippine Lakatan is usually spelled with a 'k' in botanical literature, while Masak Hijau is usually spelled with a 'c' (Lacatan) or simply called "Jamaican Lacatan". Other common names for the cultivar in Southeast Asia include "Pisang Berangan" in Malaysia; "Pisang Barangan Kuning" and "Pisang Barangan Merah" in Indonesia; "Kluai Hom Maew" and "Kluai Nga Phaya" in Thailand.

Description
Lakatan typically grows to a height of five to nine feet. The fruits can be harvested 8 to 12 months after planting. Lakatan is susceptible to the Banana Bunchy Top virus.

Lakatan fruits are longer and thicker-skinned than the Latundan bananas and turn a characteristic yellow-orange when ripe.

Uses

Lakatan is the most popular dessert banana in the Philippines. It is more expensive than the more common Latundan and Cavendish bananas. Both Latundan and Lakatan, however, are preferred by Filipinos over Cavendish.

They have higher β-Carotene content than other banana cultivars.

Diseases

Banana bunchy top virus

See also
 Banana
 Banana cultivar groups
 Masak Hijau banana
 Musa
 Musa acuminata

References

External links
 A description of Lakatan on Musapedia

Banana cultivars